Aubria is a small genus of frogs, with two (possibly three) known species. All members of this genus are found in West Africa. Their common name is ball frogs or fishing frogs.

Etymology
The genus name Aubria is in honour of Charles Eugène Aubry-Lecomte, a French colonial administrator and amateur naturalist.

Species
The recognized species are:
 Aubria masako (Ohler & Kazadi, 1990) - Masako fishing frog
 Aubria subsigillata (Duméril, 1856) - brown ball frog

The status of A. occidentalis is disputed; following the Amphibian Species of the World it is here treated as a synonym of A. subsigillata.

References

 
Pyxicephalidae
Amphibians of Sub-Saharan Africa
Amphibian genera
Taxa named by George Albert Boulenger